The 2017 Old Dominion Monarchs football team represented Old Dominion University in the 2017 NCAA Division I FBS football season. The Monarchs played their home games at the Foreman Field in Norfolk, Virginia as members of the East Division of Conference USA (C–USA). They were led by ninth-year head coach Bobby Wilder. The Monarchs finished the season 5–7, 3–5 in C-USA play to finish in sixth place.

Previous season 
The Monarchs finished the 2016 season 10–3, 7–1 in C-USA play to earn a share of the East Division title. Due to their loss to Western Kentucky, they did not qualify for the C-USA Championship game. They were invited to the Bahamas Bowl, their first ever bowl appearance, where they defeated Eastern Michigan for their first ever bowl victory.

Schedule and results
Old Dominion announced its 2017 football schedule on January 26, 2017. The 2017 schedule consists six home and away games in the regular season. The Monarchs hosted two of the four non-conference opponents, Albany from the Colonial Athletic Association and North Carolina from the Atlantic Coast Conference and travel to Massachusetts who is independent from a conference and Virginia Tech also from the Atlantic Coast Conference.

Schedule Source:

Game summaries

Albany

at Massachusetts

North Carolina

at Virginia Tech

Florida Atlantic

at Marshall

WKU

at North Texas

Charlotte

at FIU

Rice

at Middle Tennessee

References

Old Dominion
Old Dominion Monarchs football seasons
Old Dominion Monarchs football